Bulusu may refer to surname among Telugu Brahmins of Velanati Vaidiki Sub-caste:
 Bulusu Appanna Shastri, Sanskrit Scholar, Bhatnavilli, East Godavari District
 Bulusu Sambamurti, Indian lawyer, politician and freedom-fighter
 Bulusu Somayajulu, Mathematician; Kakinada who authored several books in Mathematics for Telugu Akademi and Punjab University.
 Bulusu Subrahmanyam Sastrulu of Bouloussou family; Diwan, Conseiller and Judge Advocate during French colonial rule in Yanaon
 Bulusu Surya Prakasha Sastry, Sanskrit Scholar; Tenali who was the founder of Sadhana Grandha Mandali
 Bulusu Venkata Satyanarayana Murty, Sanskrit Scholar
 Bulusu Venkateswarlu, Telugu Scholar; Philosopher; Kakinada

Indian surnames